The Nashville String Band is the 1969 debut album by The Nashville String Band. The band consisted of Chet Atkins and Homer and Jethro. Atkins produced many of Homer and Jethro's later RCA albums and they in turn performed on a number of his.

They released six albums on the RCA label.

Track listing

Side one
 "La Fiesta" (Byron Williams) – 2:30
 "Yellow Bird" (Keith - Bergman - Luboff)– 3:18
 "El Paso" (Marty Robbins)– 2:47
 "Granada" (Lara - Stewart) – 2:49
 "Adios Amigos" (Ralph Freed - Jerry Livingston) – 2:29
 "La Golondrina (The Swallow)" (N. Serradell) – 1:51

Side two
 "Caribbean" (Mitchell Torok)– 2:24
 "Tomorrow's Tears (Morir un poco)" (Alvaro Covacevic, R. I. Allen) – 2:07
 "Maria Elena" (S. K. Russell, Lorenzo Barcelata)– 3:17
 "Drina" (Stanislav Binički, Vaughn Horton) – 2:35
 "In a Little Spanish Town" (Sam M. Lewis, Joe Young, Mabel Wayne)– 2:12

Personnel 
Chet Atkins - guitar
Henry "Homer" Haynes - guitar
Kenneth "Jethro" Burns - mandolin

The Nashville String Band albums
1969 debut albums
Albums produced by Chet Atkins
Albums produced by Bob Ferguson (music)
RCA Victor albums
Instrumental albums